The 2005 Equatorial Express Airlines An-24 crash, also known as the 2005 Baney plane crash occurred on 16 July 2005 after an Equatorial Express Airlines Antonov An-24 crashed into a side of a mountain near Baney, Equatorial Guinea. The accident killed all 60 passengers and crew on board the flight.

Aircraft
The aircraft that was used on this flight was an Antonov An-24 registration 3C-VQR that had its first flight back in 1967. It had flown for Aerolíneas de Guinea Ecuatorial (AGE) from February 2002 after being brought to Equatorial Guinea. It has been reported that the aircraft did not receive its 1,000-hour maintenance check after moving to Equatorial Express.

Accident
The flight took off from Malabo International Airport on a short haul flight to Bata Airport with 54 passengers and 6 crew on board. Just minutes into the flight the aircraft tilted and fell, skidded over trees for a distance of about half a mile and crashed into a side of mountainous jungle area near Baney at 10:00pm. An hour later the wreck of the aircraft was found and there were some conflicting reports regarding the number of persons on board. According to the airline, the flight manifest shows 10 crew and 35 passengers. Government sources reported 60 people were on the plane, after first reports of 55 occupants. The total bodies found at the crash site were 60 passengers and crew.

Cause
A witness saw flames coming from the side of the plane shortly after take-off. The cause of the accident was that the aircraft was overloaded and the aircraft was only built to accommodate a maximum of 48 passengers and crew.

References

2005 disasters in Africa
Aviation accidents and incidents in 2005
Aviation accidents and incidents in Equatorial Guinea
Accidents and incidents involving the Antonov An-24
July 2005 events in Africa
2005 in Equatorial Guinea
Bioko Norte